The Dutch Eredivisie in the 1974–75 season was contested by 18 teams. PSV won the championship.

League standings

Results

See also
 1974–75 Eerste Divisie
 1974–75 KNVB Cup

References

 Eredivisie official website - info on all seasons 
 RSSSF

Eredivisie seasons
Netherlands
1